AFFF most often refers to aqueous film forming foams. It may also refer to:

Film festivals
 Asian Festival of First Films, a former film festival held in Singapore
 Imagine Film Festival, formerly Amsterdam Fantastic Film Festival

Other uses
 Adolf Fredriks Föräldraförening, the parent-teacher association at Adolf Fredrik's Music School, Stockholm, Sweden
 Advanced Fuel Fabrication Facility, BARC, at Tarapur, Maharashtra, India
 Agriculture, Forestry, Fisheries and Food Business Unit of Japan Finance Corporation in Tokyo, Japan
 Australian Farmers' Fighting Fund, a body providing financial, legal, and professional assistance to farmers in Australia